The 2022 Baltimore Orioles season was the 122nd season in Baltimore Orioles franchise history, the 69th in Baltimore, and the 31st at Oriole Park at Camden Yards. They not only massively improved on their 52–110 record from the previous year, but they also claimed their first winning season since 2016 with a record of 83–79. Their 31-game improvement was their largest improvement since 1989, when they went 87–75 one year after their former franchise worst 54–107 record, a 32.5 game improvement. Coincidentally, both of these improvements came the year after seasons that involved losing streaks of 19 or more.  The Orioles became the first team since the 1899 St. Louis Perfectos to lose 110 games in one season and post a winning record in the next. Nevertheless, the Orioles missed the playoffs for the sixth straight year.

Offseason

Lockout 

The expiration of the league's collective bargaining agreement (CBA) with the Major League Baseball Players Association occurred on December 1, 2021 with no new agreement in place. As a result, the team owners voted unanimously to lockout the players stopping all free agency and trades. 

The parties came to an agreement on a new CBA on March 10, 2022. The season was delayed to begin on April 7, 2022, a week later than the original start time.

Rule changes 
Pursuant to the new CBA, several new rules were instituted for the 2022 season. The National League will adopt the designated hitter full-time, a draft lottery will be implemented, the postseason will expand from ten teams to twelve, and advertising patches will appear on player uniforms and helmets for the first time.

Regular season standings

American League East

American League Wild Card

Record vs. Opponents

Game log  

|- bgcolor=#fbb
| 1 || April 8 || @ Rays || 1–2 || Kittredge (1–0) || López (0–1) || Raley (1) || 25,025 || 0–1 || L1
|- bgcolor=#fbb
| 2 || April 9 || @ Rays || 3–5 || Fleming (1–0) || Lyles (0–1) || Kittredge (1) || 15,615 || 0–2 || L2
|- bgcolor=#fbb
| 3 || April 10 || @ Rays || 0–8 || Springs (1–0) || Wells (0–1) || — || 14,100 || 0–3 || L3
|- bgcolor=#bfb
| 4 || April 11 || Brewers || 2–0 || Baumann (1–0) || Houser (0–1) || López (1) || 44,461 || 1–3 || W1
|- bgcolor=#fbb
| 5 || April 12 || Brewers || 4–5 || Milner (1–0) || Bautista (0–1) || Hader (2) || 11,814 || 1–4 || L1
|- bgcolor=#fbb
| 6 || April 13 || Brewers || 2–4 || Boxberger (2–0) || López (0–2) || Hader (3) || 12,704 || 1–5 || L2
|- bgcolor=#bfb
| 7 || April 15 || Yankees || 2–1  || Krehbiel (1–0) || Schmidt (0–2) || — || 32,197 || 2–5 || W1
|- bgcolor=#fbb
| 8 || April 16 || Yankees || 2–5 || Sears (1–0) || Lakins Sr. (0–1) || Holmes (1) || 28,179 || 2–6 || L1
|- bgcolor=#bfb
| 9 || April 17 || Yankees || 5–0 || López (1–1) || Loáisiga (0–1) || — || 25,938 || 3–6 || W1
|- bgcolor=#fbb
| 10 || April 18 || @ Athletics || 1–5 || Montas (2–1) || Krehbiel (0–2) || — || 17,503 || 3–7 || L1
|- bgcolor=#fbb
| 11 || April 19 || @ Athletics || 1–2 || Logue (1–0) || Baumann (1–1) || Jackson (1) || 3,478 || 3–8 || L2
|- bgcolor=#bfb
| 12 || April 20 || @ Athletics || 1–0 || Lyles (1–1) || Jefferies (1–2) || López (2) || 2,703 || 4–8 || W1
|- bgcolor=#fbb
| 13 || April 21 || @ Athletics || 4–6 || Blackburn (2–0) || Wells (0–2) || Jiménez (2) || 4,429 || 4–9 || L1
|- bgcolor=#bfb
| 14 || April 22 || @ Angels || 5–3 || Zimmermann (1–0) || Detmers (0–1) || López (3) || 31,679 || 5–9 || W1
|- bgcolor=#bfb
| 15 || April 23 || @ Angels || 5–4 || Baker (1–0) || Loup (0–1) || López (4) || 43,883 || 6–9 || W2
|- bgcolor=#fbb
| 16 || April 24 || @ Angels || 6–7 || Herget (1–0) || Baumann (1–2) || Bradley (1) || 41,984 || 6–10 || L1
|- bgcolor=#fbb
| 17 || April 26 || @ Yankees || 8–12 || Severino (2–0) || Lyles (1–2) || — || 28,596 || 6–11 || L2
|- bgcolor=#fbb
| 18 || April 27 || @ Yankees || 2–5 || King (2–0) || Krehbiel (1–2) || Holmes (2) || 31,122 || 6–12 || L3
|- bgcolor=#fbb
| 19 || April 28 || @ Yankees || 5–10 || Castro (2–0) || Zimmermann (1–1) || — || 29,268 || 6–13 || L4
|- bgcolor=#fbb
| 20 || April 29 || Red Sox || 1–3 || Houck (2–1) || Bradish (0–1) || Strahm (1) || 15,685 || 6–14 || L5
|- bgcolor=#bfb
| 21 || April 30 || Red Sox || 2–1  || López (2–1) || Sawamura (0–1) || — || 19,927 || 7–14 || W1
|-

|- bgcolor=#bfb
| 22 || May 1 || Red Sox || 9–5 || Lyles (2–2) || Pivetta (0–4) || — || 19,117 || 8–14 || W2
|- bgcolor=#fbb
| 23 || May 2 || Twins || 1–2 || Paddack (1–2) || Baker (1–1) || Durán (1) || 7,427 || 8–15 || L1
|- bgcolor=#fbb
| 24 || May 3 || Twins || 2–7 || Thielbar (1–0) || Krehbiel (1–3) || — || 6,678 || 8–16 || L2
|- bgcolor=#bfb
| 25 || May 4 || Twins || 9–4 || Pérez (1–0) || Bundy (3–2) || — || 7,466 || 9–16 || W1
|- bgcolor=#bfb
| 26 || May 5 || Twins || 5–3 || López (3–1) || Durán (0–1) || — || 8,652 || 10–16 || W2 
|- bgcolor=#bbb
| — || May 6 || Royals || colspan=7| PPD, RAIN; rescheduled for MAY 8 
|- bgcolor=#bbb
| — || May 7 || Royals || colspan=7| PPD, RAIN; rescheduled for MAY 9 
|- bgcolor=#fbb
| 27 || May 8  || Royals || 4–6 || Clarke (1–0) || López (3–2) || Barlow (2) ||  || 10–17 || L1
|- bgcolor=#bfb
| 28 || May 8  || Royals || 4–2 || Zimmermann (2–1) || Lynch (2–2) || Tate (1) || 19,893 || 11–17 || W1
|- bgcolor=#bfb
| 29 || May 9 || Royals || 6–1 || Wells (1–2) || Hernández (0–2) || — || 9,438 || 12–17 || W2
|- bgcolor=#bfb
| 30 || May 10 || @ Cardinals || 5–3 || Bradish (1–1) || Naughton (0–1) || Bautista (1) || 33,649 || 13–17 || W3
|- bgcolor=#fbb
| 31 || May 11 || @ Cardinals || 1–10 || Mikolas (3–1) || Watkins (0–1) || — || 34,533 || 13–18 || L1
|- bgcolor=#bfb
| 32 || May 12 || @ Cardinals || 3–2 || Akin (1–0) || Matz (3–3) || Bautista (2) || 35,198 || 14–18 || W1
|- bgcolor=#fbb
| 33 || May 13 || @ Tigers || 2–4 || R8dríguez (1–2) || Lyles (2–3) || Vest (1) || 23,941 || 14–19 || L1
|- bgcolor=#fbb
| 34 || May 14 || @ Tigers || 0–3 || Peralta (1–0) || Zimmermann (2–2) || Soto (5) || 28,016 || 14–20 || L2
|- bgcolor=#fbb
| 35 || May 15 || @ Tigers || 1–5 || Skubal (3–2) || Wells (1–3) || — || 20,080 || 14–21 || L3
|- bgcolor=#fbb
| 36 || May 16 || Yankees || 2–6 || Severino (3–0) || Bradish (1–2) || — || 12,228 || 14–22 || L4
|- bgcolor=#fbb
| 37 || May 17 || Yankees || 4–5 || Taillon (4–1) || Tate (0–2) || Chapman (9) || 12,635 || 14–23 || L5
|- bgcolor=#fbb
| 38 || May 18 || Yankees || 2–3 || Cole (4–0) || Lyles (2–4) || Holmes (3) || 13,850 || 14–24 || L6
|- bgcolor=#bfb
| 39 || May 19 || Yankees || 9–6 || Bautista (1–1) || Luetge (1–1) || — || 23,819 || 15–24 || W1
|- bgcolor=#bfb
| 40 || May 20 || Rays || 8–6  || Vespi (1–0) || Garza Jr. (0–1) || — || 15,127 || 16–24 || W2
|- bgcolor=#fbb
| 41 || May 21 || Rays || 1–6 || Springs (2–1) || Bradish (1–3) || — || 17,573 || 16–25 || L1
|- bgcolor=#bfb
| 42 || May 22 || Rays || 7–6  || Pérez (2–0) || Knight (0–1) || — || 23,778 || 17–25 || W1
|- bgcolor=#bfb
| 43 || May 23 || @ Yankees || 6–4 || Lyles (3–4) || Cole (4–1) || López (5) || 32,187 || 18–25 || W2
|- bgcolor=#fbb
| 44 || May 24 || @ Yankees || 6–7  || Schmidt (3–2) || Baker (1–2) || — || 32,289 || 18–26 || L1
|- bgcolor=#fbb
| 45 || May 25 || @ Yankees || 0–2 || Sears (2–0) || Wells (1–4) || Holmes (5) || 39,154 || 18–27 || L2
|- bgcolor=#bfb
| 46 || May 27 || @ Red Sox || 12–8 || Pérez (3–0) || Strahm (2–2) || — || 29,251 || 19–27 || W1
|- bgcolor=#fbb
| 47 || May 28  || @ Red Sox || 3–5 || Eovaldi (2–2) || Akin (1–1) || — || 26,912 || 19–28 || L1
|- bgcolor=#bfb
| 48 || May 28  || @ Red Sox || 4–2 || Krehbiel (2–3) || Winckowski (0–1) || López (6) || 28,491 || 20–28 || W1
|- bgcolor=#fbb
| 49 || May 29 || @ Red Sox || 2–12 || Pivetta (4–4) || Zimmermann (2–3) || — || 35,715 || 20–29 || L1
|- bgcolor=#bfb
| 50 || May 30 || @ Red Sox || 10–0 || Wells (2–4) || Hill (1–3) || — || 24,809 || 21–29 || W1
|- bgcolor=#fbb
| 51 || May 31 || Mariners || 0–10 || Kirby (1–1) || Baker (1–3) || — || 8,074 || 21–30 || L1
|-

|- bgcolor=#bfb
| 52 || June 1 || Mariners || 9–2 || Pérez (4–0) || Ray (4–6) || — || 8,400 || 22–30 || W1
|- bgcolor=#fbb
| 53 || June 2 || Mariners || 6–7  || Castillo (2–0) || López (3–3) || — || 8,817 || 22–31 || L1
|- bgcolor=#fbb
| 54 || June 3 || Guardians || 3–6 || Bieber (3–3) || Zimmermann (2–4) || Clase (8) || 15,456 || 22–32 || L2
|- bgcolor=#bfb
| 55 || June 4 || Guardians || 5–4 || Bautista (2–1) || McKenzie (3–5) || López (7) || 17,183 || 23–32 || W1
|- bgcolor=#fbb
| 56 || June 5 || Guardians || 2–3 || Plesac (2–4) || Kremer (0–1) || Clase (9) || 14,815 || 23–33 || L1
|- bgcolor=#bfb
| 57 || June 7 || Cubs || 9–3 || Baker (2–3) || Thompson (6–1) || — || 11,509 || 24–33 || W1
|- bgcolor=#bbb
| — || June 8 || Cubs || colspan=7| PPD, RAIN; rescheduled for AUG 18 
|- bgcolor=#fbb
| 58 || June 9 || @ Royals || 5–7 || Payamps (2–1) || Lyles (3–5) || Barlow (6) || 15,594 || 24–34 || L1
|- bgcolor=#fbb
| 59 || June 10 || @ Royals || 1–8 || Heasley (1–3) || Zimmermann (2–5) || — || 17,650 || 24–35 || L2
|- bgcolor=#bfb
| 60 || June 11 || @ Royals || 6–4 || Wells (3–4) || Lynch (2–6) || López (8) || 15,134 || 25–35 || W1
|- bgcolor=#bfb
| 61 || June 12 || @ Royals || 10–7 || Kremer (1–1) || Keller (1–8) || Pérez (1) || 15,037 || 26–35 || W2
|- bgcolor=#fbb
| 62 || June 13 || @ Blue Jays || 1–11 || Manoah (8–1) || Bradish (1–4) || — || 19,716 || 26–36 || L1
|- bgcolor=#bfb
| 63 || June 14 || @ Blue Jays || 6–5 || Lyles (4–5) || Kikuchi (2–3) || López (9) || 23,106 || 27–36 || W1
|- bgcolor=#fbb
| 64 || June 15 || @ Blue Jays || 6–7  || Cimber (7–2) || Bautista (2–2) || — || 19,961 || 27–37 || L1
|- bgcolor=#bfb
| 65 || June 16 || @ Blue Jays || 10–2 || Wells (4–4) || Gausman (5–6) || — || 36,832 || 28–37 || W1 
|- bgcolor=#bfb
| 66 || June 17 || Rays || 1–0 || Bautista (3–2) || Faucher (0–1) || López (10) || 13,140 || 29–37 ||  W2
|- bgcolor=#fbb
| 67 || June 18 || Rays || 6–7 || Faucher (1–1) || Tate (0–3) || Poche (4) || 15,426 || 29–38 || L1
|- bgcolor=#bfb
| 68 || June 19 || Rays || 2–1 || Vespi (2–0) || Kluber (3–4) || López (11) || 23,004 || 30–38 ||  W1
|- bgcolor=#fbb
| 69 || June 21 || Nationals || 0–3 || Fedde (5–5) || Lyles (4–6) || Rainey (8) || 19,197 || 30–39 || L1
|- bgcolor=#bfb
| 70 || June 22 || Nationals || 7–0  || Wells (5–4) || Corbin (3–10) || Vespi (1) || 12,630 || 31–39 || W1
|- bgcolor=#bfb
| 71 || June 23 || @ White Sox || 4–0 || Kremer (2–1) || Cueto (1–4) || López (12) || 22,431 || 32–39 || W2
|- bgcolor=#bfb
| 72 || June 24 || @ White Sox || 4–1 || Krehbiel (3–3) || Kopech (2–4) || López (13) || 27,943 || 33–39 || W3
|- bgcolor=#bfb
| 73 || June 25 || @ White Sox || 6–2 || Watkins (1–1) || Lynn (1–1) || — || 29,282 || 34–39 || W4
|- bgcolor=#fbb
| 74 || June 26 || @ White Sox || 3–4 || Cease (6–3) || Lyles (4–7) || Graveman (3) || 29,191 || 34–40 || L1
|- bgcolor=#bfb
| 75 || June 27 || @ Mariners || 9–2 || Wells (6–4) || Kirby (2–3) || Akin (1) || 21,615 || 35–40 || W1
|- bgcolor=#fbb
| 76 || June 28 || @ Mariners || 0–2 || Castillo (5–1) || Pérez (4–1) || Sewald (7) || 16,024 || 35–41 || L1
|- bgcolor=#fbb
| 77 || June 29 || @ Mariners || 3–9 || Flexen (4–8) || Voth (0–1) || — || 17,412 || 35–42 || L2
|-

|- bgcolor=#fbb
| 78 || July 1 || @ Twins || 2–3 || Minaya (1–0) || López (3–4) || — || 25,540 || 35–43 || L3
|- bgcolor=#fbb
| 79 || July 2 || @ Twins || 3–4 || Pagán (2–3) || López (3–5) || — || 20,618 || 35–44 || L4
|- bgcolor=#bfb
| 80 || July 3 || @ Twins || 3–1 || Wells (7–4) || Smeltzer (4–2) || Tate (2) || 24,424 || 36–44 || W1
|- bgcolor=#bfb
| 81 || July 4 || Rangers || 7–6  || Baker (3–3) || Moore (3–1) || — || 18,670 || 37–44 || W2
|- bgcolor=#bfb
| 82 || July 5 || Rangers || 10–9  || Krehbiel (4–3) || Moore (3–2) || — || 7,371 || 38–44 || W3
|- bgcolor=#bfb
| 83 || July 6 || Rangers || 2–1 || Watkins (2–1) || Otto (4–5) || López (14) || 7,648 || 39–44 || W4
|- bgcolor=#bfb
| 84 || July 7 || Angels || 4–1 || Lyles (5–7) || Silseth (1–3) || López (15) || 13,088 || 40–44 || W5
|- bgcolor=#bfb
| 85 || July 8 || Angels || 5–4 || Tate (1–3) || Iglesias (2–5) || — || 27,814 || 41–44 || W6
|- bgcolor=#bfb
| 86 || July 9 || Angels || 1–0 || Kremer (3–1) || Sandoval (3–4) || López (16) || 32,286 || 42–44 || W7
|- bgcolor=#bfb
| 87 || July 10 || Angels || 9–5 || Voth (1–1) || Suárez (1–3) || — || 19,521 || 43–44 || W8
|- bgcolor=#bfb
| 88 || July 12 || @ Cubs || 4–2 || Lyles (6–7) || Sampson (0–1) || López (17) || 31,079 || 44–44 || W9
|- bgcolor=#bfb
| 89 || July 13 || @ Cubs || 7–1 || Watkins (3–1) || Steele (3–6) || — || 29,529 || 45–44 || W10
|- bgcolor=#fbb
| 90 || July 15 || @ Rays || 4–5 || Wisler (3–3) || Wells (7–5) || Raley (6) || 13,917 || 45–45 || L1
|- bgcolor=#bfb
| 91 || July 16 || @ Rays || 6–4  || López (4–5) || Bard (1–1) || Krehbiel (1) || 19,886 || 46–45 || W1
|- bgcolor=#fbb
| 92 || July 17 || @ Rays || 5–7 || Kluber (6–5) || Lyles (6–8) || Adam (4) || 13,813 || 46–46 || L1
|- bgcolor=#bbcaff
| ASG || July 19 || @ Dodger Stadium || AL @ NL || Valdez (1–0) || Gonsolin (0–1) || Clase (1) || 52,518 || — || N/A
|- bgcolor=#fbb
| 93 || July 22 || Yankees || 6–7 || Luetge (3–3) || Wells (7–6) || Holmes (17) || 28,468 || 46–47 || L2
|- bgcolor=#bfb
| 94 || July 23 || Yankees || 6–3 || Pérez (5–1) || Cole (9–3) || López (18) || 36,361 || 47–47 || W1
|- bgcolor=#fbb
| 95 || July 24 || Yankees || 0–6 || Cortés Jr. (8–3) || Kremer (3–2) || Schmidt (1) || 25,623 || 47–48 || L1
|- bgcolor=#bfb
| 96 ||July 25  || Rays || 5–1 || Vespi (3–0) || Kluber (6–6) || — || 9,606 || 48–48 || W1
|- bgcolor=#bfb
| 97 || July 26 || Rays || 5–3 || Akin (2–1) || Poche (2–1) || López (19) || 11,307 || 49–48 || W2
|- bgcolor=#fbb
| 98 || July 27 || Rays || 4–6  || Poche (3–1) || López (4–6) || Fairbanks (1) || 13,592 || 49–49 || L1
|- bgcolor=#bfb
| 99 || July 28 || Rays || 3–0 || Lyles (7–8) || Yarbrough (0–6) || Bautista (3) || 16,784 || 50–49 || W1
|- bgcolor=#bfb
| 100 || July 29 || @ Reds || 6–2 || Tate (2–3) || Farmer (0–1) || — || 23,658 || 51–49 || W2
|- bgcolor=#fbb
| 101 || July 30 || @ Reds || 2–8 || Mahle (5–7) || Kremer (3–3) || — || 29,104 || 51–50 || L1
|- bgcolor=#fbb
| 102 || July 31 || @ Reds || 2–3 || Díaz (3–1) || Bautista (3–3) || Farmer (1) || 20,496 || 51–51 || L2
|-

|- bgcolor=#bfb
| 103 || August 1 || @ Rangers || 7–2 || Watkins (4–1) || Gray (7–6) || Akin (2) || 19,161 || 52–51 || W1
|- bgcolor=#bfb
| 104 || August 2 || @ Rangers || 8–2 || Lyles (8–8) || Howard (2–3) || — || 21,622 || 53–51 || W2
|- bgcolor=#bfb
| 105 || August 3 || @ Rangers || 6–3 || Pérez (6–1) || Leclerc (0–1) || — || 20,221 || 54–51 || W3
|- bgcolor=#bfb
| 106 || August 5 || Pirates || 1–0 || Kremer (4–3) || Keller (3–8) || Bautista (4) || 25,613 || 55–51 || W4
|- bgcolor=#bfb
| 107 || August 6 || Pirates || 6–3 || Voth (2–1) || Brubaker (2–10) || — || 41,086 || 56–51 || W5
|- bgcolor=#fbb
| 108 || August 7 || Pirates || 1–8 || Wilson (2–6) || Watkins (4–2) || — || 16,714 || 56–52 || L1
|- bgcolor=#bfb
| 109 || August 8 || Blue Jays || 7–4 || Lyles (9–8) || Kikuchi (4–6) || Bautista (5) || 12,671 || 57–52 || W1
|- bgcolor=#bfb
| 110 || August 9 || Blue Jays || 6–5 || Vespi (4–0) || García (1–4) || Bautista (6) || 11,080 || 58–52 || W2
|- bgcolor=#bbb
| — || August 10 || Blue Jays || colspan=7| PPD, RAIN; rescheduled for SEPT 5  
|- bgcolor=#fbb
| 111 || August 11 || @ Red Sox || 3–4 || Davis (2–1) || Kremer (4–4) || Schreiber (4) || 33,927 || 58–53 || L1
|- bgcolor=#bfb
| 112 || August 12 || @ Rays || 10–3 || Voth (3–1) || Kluber (7–7) || — || 12,380 || 59–53 || W1
|- bgcolor=#fbb
| 113 || August 13 || @ Rays || 2–8 || McClanahan (11–5) || Hall (0–1) || — || 16,823 || 59–54 || L1
|- bgcolor=#fbb
| 114 || August 14 || @ Rays || 1–4 || Rasmussen (7–4) || Lyles (9–9) || Adam (6) || 18,093 || 59–55 || L2
|- bgcolor=#bfb
| 115 || August 15 || @ Blue Jays || 7–3 || Baker (4–3) || Kikuchi (4–7) || — || 26,769 || 60–55 || W1
|- bgcolor=#bfb
| 116 || August 16 || @ Blue Jays || 4–2 || Kremer (5–4) || Manoah (12–6) || Bautista (7) || 37,940 || 61–55 || W2
|- bgcolor=#fbb
| 117 || August 17 || @ Blue Jays || 1–6 || García (2–4) || Krehbiel (4–4) || — || 40,141 || 61–56 || L1
|- bgcolor=#fbb
| 118 || August 18 || Cubs || 2–3 || Sampson (1–3) || Watkins (4–3) || Hughes (1) || 19,454 || 61–57 || L2
|- bgcolor=#bfb
| 119 || August 19 || Red Sox || 15–10 || Vespi (5–0) || Crawford (5–3) || — || 33,136 || 62–57 || W1
|- bgcolor=#fbb
| 120 || August 20 || Red Sox || 3–4 || Wacha (8–1) || Bradish (1–5) || Whitlock (5) || 34,939 || 62–58 || L1
|- bgcolor=#bfb
| 121 || August 21 || Red Sox || 5–3 || Pérez (7–1) || Barnes (0–4) || Bautista (8) || 2,467 || 63–58 || W1
|- bgcolor=#bfb
| 122 || August 23 || White Sox || 5–3 || Voth (4–1) || Cease (12–6) || Bautista (9) || 12,954 || 64–58 || W2
|- bgcolor=#fbb
| 123 || August 24 || White Sox || 3–5 || Giolito (10–7) || Watkins (4–4) || — || 12,565 || 64–59 || L1
|- bgcolor=#bfb
| 124 || August 25 || White Sox || 4–3  || Bautista (4–3) || Diekman (5–3) || — || 13,905 || 65–59 || W1
|- bgcolor=#bfb
| 125 || August 26 || @ Astros || 2–0 || Bradish (2–5) || Javier (7–9) || Tate (3) || 31,035 || 66–59 || W2
|- bgcolor=#bfb
| 126 || August 27 || @ Astros || 3–1 || Kremer (6–4) || Urquidy (12–5) || Bautista (10) || 34,526 || 67–59 || W3
|- bgcolor=#fbb
| 127 || August 28 || @ Astros || 1–3 || Stanek (2–1) || Voth (4–2) || Montero (9) || 31,559 || 67–60 || L1
|- bgcolor=#fbb
| 128 || August 30 || @ Guardians || 1–5 || Quantrill (11–5) || Watkins (4–5) || — || 12,492 || 67–61 || L2
|- bgcolor=#bfb
| 129 || August 31 || @ Guardians || 4–0 || Lyles (10–9) || McKenzie (9–11) || — || 12,221 || 68–61 || W1
|-

|- bgcolor=#bfb
| 130 || September 1 || @ Guardians || 3–0 || Bradish (3–5) || Bieber (8–8) || Bautista (11) || 11,827 || 69–61 || W2
|- bgcolor=#bfb
| 131 || September 2 || Athletics || 5–2 || Tate (3–3) || Acevedo (3–3) || — || 13,558 || 70–61 || W3
|- bgcolor=#bfb
| 132 || September 3 || Athletics || 8–1 || Akin (3–1) || Oller (2–7) || — || 30,853 || 71–61 || W4
|- bgcolor=#fbb
| 133 || September 4 || Athletics || 0–5 || Martínez (4–3) || Watkins (4–6) || — || 19,883 || 71–62 || L1
|- bgcolor=#fbb
| 134 || September 5  || Blue Jays || 3–7 || Gausman (11–9) || Baumann (1–3) || — ||  || 71–63 || L2
|- bgcolor=#fbb
| 135 || September 5  || Blue Jays || 4–8 || Berríos (10–5) || Akin (3–2) || — || 25,451 || 71–64 || L3
|- bgcolor=#bfb
| 136 || September 6 || Blue Jays || 9–6 || Tate (4–3) || White (1–6) || Bautista (12) || 8,411 || 72–64 || W1
|- bgcolor=#fbb
| 137 || September 7 || Blue Jays || 1–4 || Manoah (14–7) || Kremer (6–5) || Romano (31) || 11,488 || 72–65 || L1
|- bgcolor=#bfb
| 138 || September 9 || Red Sox || 3–2 || Reed (2–0) || Bello (1–5) || Tate (4) || 16,451 || 73–65 || W1
|- bgcolor=#fbb
| 139 || September 10 || Red Sox || 4–17 || Wacha (11–1) || Lyles (10–10) || — || 26,050 || 73–66 || L1
|- bgcolor=#fbb
| 140 || September 11 || Red Sox || 0–1 || Hill (7–6) || Bradish (3–6) || Barnes (5) || 16,030 || 73–67 || L2
|- bgcolor=#bfb
| 141 || September 13 || @ Nationals || 4–3 || Kremer (7–5) || Harvey (1–1) || Bautista (13) || 31,679 || 74–67 || W1
|- bgcolor=#bfb
| 142 || September 14 || @ Nationals || 6–2 || Voth (5–2) || Thompson (1–1) || — || 32,497 || 75–67 || W2
|- bgcolor=#fbb
| 143 || September 16 || @ Blue Jays || 3–6 || Kikuchi (5–7) || Lyles (10–11) || — || 36,573 || 75–68 || L1
|- bgcolor=#fbb
| 144 || September 17 || @ Blue Jays || 3–6 || Berríos (11–5) || Bradish (3–7) || Romano (34) || 44,448 || 75–69 || L2
|- bgcolor=#bfb
| 145 || September 18 || @ Blue Jays || 5–4 || Krehbiel (5–4) || Romano (5–4) || Bautista (14) || 41,301 || 76–69 || W1
|- bgcolor=#fbb
| 146 || September 19 || Tigers || 0–11 || Alexander (4–10) || Wells (7–7) || — || 10,201 || 76–70 || L1
|- bgcolor=#fbb
| 147 || September 20 || Tigers || 2–3 || Wentz (2–2) || Voth (5–3) || Soto (26) || 9,582 || 76–71 || L2
|- bgcolor=#bfb
| 148 || September 21 || Tigers || 8–1 || Lyles (11–11) || Manning (2–3) || — || 9,314 || 77–71 || W1
|- bgcolor=#bfb
| 149 || September 22 || Astros || 2–0 || Bradish (4–7) || Verlander (17–4) || Bautista (15) || 16,417 || 78–71 || W2
|- bgcolor=#bfb
| 150 || September 23 || Astros || 6–0 || Kremer (8–5) || Urquidy (13–8) || — || 22,833 || 79–71 || W3
|- bgcolor=#fbb
| 151 || September 24 || Astros || 10–11 || Montero (5–2) || Bautista (4–4) || Pressly (31) || 22,546 || 79–72 || L1
|- bgcolor=#fbb
| 152 || September 25 || Astros || 3–6  || Neris (6–4) || Akin (3–3) || — || 24,449 || 79–73 || L2
|- bgcolor=#bfb
| 153 || September 26 || @ Red Sox || 14–8 || Watkins (5–6) || Seabold (0–4) || — || 25,634 || 80–73 || W1
|- bgcolor=#fbb
| 154 || September 27 || @ Red Sox || 9–13 || Strahm (4–4) || Krehbiel (5–5) || — || 30,765 || 80–74 || L1
|- bgcolor=#fbb
| 155 || September 28 || @ Red Sox || 1–3 || Hill (8–7) || Kremer (8–6) || Barnes (6) || 33,073 || 80–75 || L2
|- bgcolor=#fbb
| 156 || September 29 || @ Red Sox || 3–5 || Kelly (1–0) || Tate (4–4) || Ort (1) || 29,779 || 80–76 || L3
|- bgcolor=#bfb
| 157 || September 30 || @ Yankees || 2–1 || Lyles (12–11) || Germán (2–4) || Hall (1) || 47,583 || 81–76 || W1
|-

|- bgcolor=#fbb
| 158 || October 1 || @ Yankees || 0–8 || Cortés Jr. (12–4) || Voth (5–4) || — || 45,248 || 81–77 || L1
|- bgcolor=#bfb
| 159 || October 2 || @ Yankees || 3–1 || Gillaspie (1–0) || Chapman (3–4) || Tate (5) || 44,332 || 82–77 || W1
|- bgcolor=#fbb
| 160 || October 3 || Blue Jays || 1–5  || Berríos (12–7) || Kremer (8–7) || Mayza (2) || 10,642 || 82–78 || L1
|- bgcolor=#bbb 
| — || October 4 || Blue Jays || colspan=7| PPD, RAIN; rescheduled for OCT 5
|- bgcolor=#bfb
| 161 || October 5  || Blue Jays || 5–4 || Hall (1–1) || White (1–7) || Baker (1) ||  || 83–78 || W1
|- bgcolor=#fbb
| 162 || October 5  || Blue Jays || 1–5 || Kikuchi (6–7) || Canó (1–1) || — || 17,248 || 83–79 || L1
|-

Roster

Orioles team leaders

Updated through games of October 5.

 Minimum 3.1 plate appearances per team games played
AVG qualified batters: Hays, Mateo, Mountcastle, Mullins, Santander

 Minimum 1 inning pitched per team games played
ERA & WHIP qualified pitchers: Lyles

Farm system

References

External links 
 2022 Baltimore Orioles season at official site
 2022 Baltimore Orioles season at Baseball Reference

Baltimore Orioles seasons
Baltimore Orioles
Baltimore Orioles